"Mom" is a song by the band Earth, Wind & Fire released as a single in November 1972 by Columbia Records. The song peaked at No. 39 on the Cashbox Top R&B Songs chart.

Overview
"Mom" was produced by Joe Wissert and composed by Maurice White with Verdine White. The single's b-side was a song called Power. Both Mom and Power came off Earth, Wind & Fire's 1972 album Last Days and Time.

Critical reception
Billboard called Mom "a fine blues ballad". Record World described the song as a "soulful swinger". Paul Sexton of Record Mirror called Mom "one of the (album's) highlights."
Robert Christgau of the Village Voice described the song as "their best tune" on the album. Ovid Goode Jr. of the Los Angeles Daily News also noted that "A little sentimentality is expressed on the album with 'Mom', a song expressing the love and dedication that only a mother can give."

Samples
"Mom" was sampled by DJ Quik on the track "Speed" off his 1998 album Rhythm-al-ism. The single's b-side Power, was sampled by Mac Miller on the track BDE Bonus from his 2011 album Best Day Ever  and by OGC on the song Gun Clap from their 1996 album Da Storm.

References

Earth, Wind & Fire songs
1972 songs
1972 singles
Columbia Records singles
Songs written by Maurice White
Songs written by Verdine White